General Muhammad Andika Perkasa (born Fransiskus Xaverius Emanuel Andika Perkasa; 21 December 1964) is an Indonesian general who previously served as the 21st Commander of the Indonesian National Armed Forces. He was appointed by President of Indonesia Joko Widodo in November 2021, replacing the retiring ACM Hadi Tjahjanto.

Upon passing out from the Military Academy in 1987, he began his career in the Infantry and was first commissioned to the 2nd Group Para Commandos, Army Special Forces Command in 1987. He then continued his studies in the United States for eight years. He became the Commander of the Presidential Security Force by 2014 and saw rapid rise through his career, holding important and strategic positions and being promoted from a one-star brigadier general to a four-star general just within five years.

Background
Perkasa was born in Bandung, West Java on 21 December 1964.

He is married to Diah Erwiany, who is the daughter of the then Indonesian State Intelligence Agency chief, Hendropriyono.

Education

Indonesia
Indonesian Military Academy, graduated 1987
Indonesia Open University
Indonesian Army Command and General Staff College, best graduate of class XXXVII (37) 1999/2000.
National Resilience Institute

International
The Military College of Vermont, Norwich University (Northfield, Vermont, United States).
National War College, National Defense University (Washington D.C., United States).
Harvard University, (Cambridge, MA, USA).
The Trachtenberg School of Public Policy and Public Administration, The George Washington University (Washington D.C., USA).

Military career
 
Perkasa graduated from the Indonesian Military Academy in 1987 (Class 1987), and was commissioned to the Army Special Forces (Kopassus) as a platoon commander. He spent most of his early career as a junior officer in the army special forces for fifteen years, eventually later becoming a lieutenant colonel and a battalion commander in the unit by 2002. During his career in the army special forces, at the rank of Major in 2000–2001, he was temporarily assigned at the Department of Defence as an analyst at the Directorate of Defence Strategy Policy, then eventually assigned back to the Army special forces clandestine unit in 2002 as the Commander of Battalion 32, Group 3 Sandi Yudha after being promoted to lieutenant colonel.

After serving as battalion commander in the Army special forces, he then was transferred to the territorial Army in 2002, where he became the Head section officer for Intelligence in the 051 "Wijayakarta" Military Area Command (Korem) under the Greater Jakarta Regional Command in 2002. Less than a year later, he was assigned to the Strategic Intelligence Agency (BAIS TNI). During his career in the Army special forces (Kopassus), Perkasa participated in various operations such as in East Timor (1992), Aceh (1994) and Papua, and was also involved in the 2002 capture of Al-Qaeda member Omar al-Faruq in Bogor.

Between 2003 and 2011, as a middle-ranking officer, Perkasa went to the United States where he received military education at the National War College and Norwich University, and also studied for a master's degree at Harvard University in addition to a doctorate at George Washington University. After returning to Indonesia, he was promoted as Colonel and was appointed as the Commander of the Kodam Jaya Regional Training Regiment in 2011, and then in 2012 he was appointed as Commander of the 023 "Kawal Samudera" Military Area Command (Korem) under the 1st (I) "Bukit Barisan" Regional Command in North Sumatera.

By 2013, he was promoted to Brigadier general and was appointed as the Head of the Army Public Relations office. Several days after the inauguration of President Joko Widodo, Perkasa was appointed as the commander of the Presidential Security Force and was promoted to Major general. By 2016, he was appointed as the commander of the 12th (XII) "Tanjungpura" Regional Command and in early 2018 he was promoted to Lieutenant general and was appointed as the Head of the Indonesian Army Doctrine, Education and Training Development Command. In July 2018, Perkasa was appointed as the Commander of the Army Strategic Command (Kostrad).

On 22 November 2018, Perkasa was promoted to a four-star general, before being appointed and sworn in as the Chief of Staff of the Indonesian Army. Perkasa was one of the four candidates proposed by Commander of the National Armed Forces Hadi Tjahjanto to replace the retiring General Mulyono.

As of 5 November 2021, Perkasa was the single candidate to replace the retiring ACM Hadi Tjahjanto by the President of Indonesia to the People's Representative Council. On 17 November 2021, Perkasa was officially promoted and assigned as Commander of the National Armed Forces by the President of Indonesia.

On 30 March 2022, Perkasa lifted the ban on descendants of the Communist Party of Indonesia from joining the military, calling that the ban had "no legal basis".

Awards and decorations 
General Andika has received the following awards:

References

1964 births
Living people
People from Bandung
Indonesian generals
Chiefs of Staff of the Indonesian Army
Indonesian National Military Academy alumni
Harvard University alumni
George Washington University alumni
National War College alumni
Indonesian Muslims
Converts to Islam from Roman Catholicism
Indonesian former Christians
Honorary Officers of the Order of Australia